Jarrett Keohokalole (born August 7, 1983) is an American politician serving as a Democratic member of the Hawaii Senate, representing the 24th district which includes Kāne‘ohe and Kailua. He previously served in the Hawaii House of Representatives. He represented the 48th House District, which includes Kāne‘ohe, Kahalu‘u, and Waiāhole. Jarrett is a seventh-generation resident of Kāne‘ohe.

Education
In 2006, Keohokalole received a bachelor's degree in Journalism from the University of Hawaiʻi at Mānoa. He then obtained a Juris Doctor degree from William S. Richardson School of Law at the University of Hawaii in 2013, earning a certificate in Native Hawaiian Law.

Political career

Hawaii House of Representatives
Keohokalole was first elected in 2014 and was unopposed in the 2016 election. He served as the House Majority Policy Leader and Vice Chair of the committee on Economic Development & Business. He also served as a member on the committees of Labor & Public Employment (LAB) and Finance (FIN).

Hawaii State Senate
Keohokalole was elected to serve the 24th Senate District on November 6, 2018. He currently serves as Majority Floor Leader, Chair of the committee on Health (HTH), Vice Chair of the committees on Judiciary (JDC) and Hawaiian Affairs (HWN), and member of the committee on Labor, Culture, and the Arts (LCA). Keohokalole is also Co-Chair of the Legislative Hawaiian Caucus, and member of the Senate Special Committee on COVID-19, Hawaii 2.0 Initiative, Mayor's Economic Recovery Task Force, and ETS Information Technology Steering Committee.

Keohokalole formerly served as Chair of the committee on Technology and member of the committees on Commerce, Consumer Protection, and Health (CPH) and Energy, Economic Development, and Tourism (EET).

Personal life
In 2010, Jarrett married Kāne‘ohe resident Ku'ulani Miyashiro. Together, they have three children.

References

1983 births
Living people
21st-century American politicians
Democratic Party Hawaii state senators
Democratic Party members of the Hawaii House of Representatives
University of Hawaiʻi at Mānoa alumni
William S. Richardson School of Law alumni